Berglern is a municipality in the district of Erding in Bavaria,

References

Erding (district)